Ibu Pertiwi is a popular Indonesian patriotic song composed by Kamsidi Samsuddin in 1908. The song's lyrics are about Ibu Pertiwi, the national personification of Indonesia (also interpreted as "mother country"). It is normally sung by Indonesian children, elementary and secondary school students, or played during Indonesian Independence Day celebrations. In 2016 the Indonesian classical composer, Ananda Sukarlan, made a set of variations for piano based on this song.

Lyrics
The lyrics are as following:

Original lyrics
(in Indonesian)

First verse:
Kulihat ibu pertiwi
Sedang bersusah hati
Air matanya berlinang
Mas intannya terkenang

Hutan gunung sawah lautan
Simpanan kekayaan
Kini ibu sedang lara
Merintih dan berdoa

Second verse:
Kulihat ibu pertiwi
Kami datang berbakti
Lihatlah putra-putrimu
Menggembirakan ibu

Ibu kami tetap cinta
Putramu yang setia
Menjaga harta pusaka
Untuk nusa dan bangsa

Translation
First verse:
I see Motherland (Ibu Pertiwi: personification of Indonesia)
(She is) in sorrow
Her tears are flowing
Remembering your (lost) golds and diamonds

Forests, mountains, farms, and the seas
Home of the treasures (richness)
Now Mother is grieving
Sighing sadly and praying

Second verse:
I see Motherland
We come to serve (you)
Behold your sons and daughters
They will make Mother happy

Mother, we still love (you)
Your faithful sons
Guarding the heirloom
For our homeland and nation

Adoption of Christian Hymn music
Although the lyrics were originally composed, the music and melody of this adaptation resembled the Christian hymn What a Friend We Have in Jesus, originally written by Joseph M. Scriven as a poem in 1855. The hymn is sung in Indonesian as Yesus Kawan yang Sejati and in Toba Batak as Ise do Alealenta and is popular in Batak churches, as well as in Protestant and Roman Catholic churches. Even though Indonesia has a statistically larger Muslim community, the hymn is quite widely known. Prior his death in 1958, the melody of the music was adopted by Kamsidi Samsuddin, the composer of the Ibu Pertiwi song.

See also
 Ibu Pertiwi

References

External links
 https://web.archive.org/web/20100917175417/http://organisasi.org/ibu-pertiwi-lirik-lagu-anak-anak-musik-nasional-lawas-indonesia

Indonesian songs
Year of song unknown
Indonesian patriotic songs